The Battle's Just Begun is the second album released by Jersey for Fueled by Ramen on August 24, 1999.

Track listing
 "Eye to Eye" – 2:07
 "Sweet Redemption" – 3:18
 "The Battle's Just Begun" – 3:17
 "Glass Dick" – 3:20 
 "Untouchable" – 3:35
 "809" – 4:08 
 "Fadeaway" – 3:34
 "1959" – 2:55 
 "The Only Girl" – 3:01 
 "Poison Ivy" – 3:33

1999 albums
Jersey (band) albums
Fueled by Ramen albums